Hue and Cry is a 1947 British film directed by Charles Crichton and starring Alastair Sim, Harry Fowler and Joan Dowling.

It is generally considered to be the first of the Ealing comedies, although it is better characterised as a thriller for children. Shot almost entirely on location, it is now a notable historic document due to its vivid portrait of a London still showing the damage of the Second World War. London forms the backdrop of a crime-gangster plot which revolves around a working class children's street culture and children's secret clubs.

Plot
Following church choir practice in 1946 east London, Joe Kirby (Harry Fowler) reads aloud to his gang (The Blood and Thunder Boys) from the Trump boys' comic, but finds a page missing. He then buys a copy so he can follow the adventures of fictional detective Selwyn Pike. While reading one part of the latest story, Joe finds the comic adventure being repeated exactly in real life when he comes across two men carrying a crate (Joe thinks it contains corpses) into Mr Jago's fur shop. Even the truck number plate—GZ 4216—matches the comic.

Joe gets a friend to distract Jago so he can search the crates. Jago catches Joe and calls the police but he does not press charges. A policeman, Inspector Ford, tells Joe to stop letting his imagination run wild. Ford sends Joe to meet a Covent Garden grocer, Nightingale (Jack Warner), for a job. Nightingale likes Joe's stories.

Later, in a hideout in a bombed-out building, Joe's friends tease him about the incident, until another boy says he saw a truck with GZ 4216 plate that morning. Joe says he thinks criminals are planning jobs via the Trump. To find out more they visit the comic's writer, Felix Wilkinson (Alastair Sim).
Joe and Alec find Wilkinson's house, find out the comic's editions are being manipulated and tell Wilkinson. He sees the criminals are using the codes from the comic to communicate their plans but, fearful of the gang, Wilkinson refuses to aid the boys.

Joe tells the police but nobody listens so he visits the offices of the Trump. Here Joe meets Norman and together they work out the code from the next issue - 'Tattoo Jack's’ plan to rob an Oxford Street department store. At the store, Joe's gang think they have overpowered the thieves but it is really the police, who have been tipped off anonymously. The kids scarper down a manhole.

Norman then tells the kids about Rhona Davis (Valerie White) who also works at the Trump. After following her home, the boys tie her up. Joe then telephones Nightingale, who then rescues Miss Davis. One of Joe's gang gets in the villain's car unnoticed and hears that stolen goods are being moved to Ballard's Wharf but without seeing that it is Nightingale.

Joe then gets Wilkinson to create a Trump story that sends all the criminals to Ballard's Wharf. Next day, Joe tells Nightingale the whole plan, but then realises he is the mastermind as his car number plate matches. Nightingale and Miss Davis review the latest Trump story and are amused at Joe's attempt to capture them, that is until Nightingale realises Joe has caught him out by sending the crooks to Nightingale's own warehouse.

Joe goes to the warehouse and finds the stolen furs but is disturbed by Nightingale. However, when the other crooks arrive, Nightingale doesn't know the password as he never finished the latest comic story. He's knocked unconscious by the crooks. Heading for Ballard's Wharf, the crooks are outnumbered by hundreds of boys who capture them. Nightingale tries to flee in a van, but Joe leaps aboard and causes it to crash. Nightingale runs into a bombed building and, after a fight with Joe, Nightingale falls through one of the many holes in the floor. Joe jumps on to Nightingale, sprawled out below, winding him completely just as the police arrive. The final scene returns to the same church choir session as at the film's beginning, but with many of the boys now sporting black eyes and bandages, war-wounds from their recent adventures.

Cast

Reception
On 23 February 1947, the film opened at the Tivoli cinema on the Strand in London. According to trade papers, the film was a "notable box office attraction" at British cinemas in 1947.

Restoration
The film was digitally restored and released on Blu-ray and DVD in 2015.

External links
 
 Hue and Cry at screenonline

References

1947 films
1940s crime comedy films
British crime comedy films
British black-and-white films
1940s adventure comedy films
Films set in 1946
Films set in London
Films directed by Charles Crichton
Films produced by Michael Balcon
Films with screenplays by T. E. B. Clarke
Films scored by Georges Auric
Ealing Studios films
Films about comics
1947 comedy films
1940s English-language films
1940s British films